Belle Baker (December 25, 1893 in New York City – April 29, 1957 in Los Angeles) was an American singer and actress. Popular throughout the 1910s and 1920s, Baker introduced a number of ragtime and torch songs including Irving Berlin's "Blue Skies" and "My Yiddishe Mama". She performed in the Ziegfeld Follies and introduced a number of Irving Berlin's songs. An early adapter to radio, Baker hosted her own radio show during the 1930s. Eddie Cantor called her “Dinah Shore, Patti Page, Peggy Lee, Judy Garland all rolled into one.”

Early life
Baker was born Bella Becker in 1893 to a Russian Jewish family. Baker started performing at the Lower East Side's Cannon Street Music Hall at age 11, where she was discovered by the Yiddish Theatre manager Jacob Adler. She was managed in vaudeville by Lew Leslie, who would become Baker's first husband. She made her vaudeville debut in Scranton, Pennsylvania at the age of 15. She performed in Oscar Hammerstein I's Victoria Theatre in 1911, although her performance was panned, mainly for her song choices. By age 17, she was a headliner. One of her earliest hits was, "Cohen Owes Me $97".

 By 1917, she was a top headliner in New York. In the early 1920s, when she was well known as The Ragtime Singer, Baker took part in a Baltimore song competition with Catherine Calvert, Pearl and Violet Hamilton, and Jessie Fordyce. She was the first artist to record "All of Me", one of the most recorded songs of its era, and she was also the first person in the United States to do a radio broadcast from a moving train. Baker became known for her ragtime and torch songs including, "Hard Hearted Hannah", "My Sin", "My Kid", "When the Black Sheep Returns to the Fold", and "I'll Pick Myself a California Rose". She made a handful of recordings, including "Hard Hearted Hannah" in 1924.

As Baker's fame rose as a vocalist, she became known for her Yiddish themed torch songs. In 1925, fellow vaudevillian Sophie Tucker gave Baker a song that had been sent to her for consideration. "My Yiddishe Mama" was a blatant tearjerker, but it was immensely popular and became Baker's signature song. Similar songs Baker recorded included, "My Man", "My Kid", "Baby Your Mother" and "My Sin".

Broadway and film
In 1926, Baker had the title role in Broadway's Betsy. She introduced Irving Berlin's "Blue Skies" in the Florenz Ziegfeld production, which ran for 39 performances from December 28, 1926 to January 29, 1927. With music by Richard Rodgers and lyrics by Lorenz Hart, the musical comedy had a book by Irving Caesar and David Freedman. Victor Baravelle was the musical director. Irving Berlin's "Blue Skies" was a last-minute addition to the show; Baker's performance of it went over so well that the audience demanded more than twenty encores of the tune.

Baker had a brief film career as silent film gave way to lavish technicolor musical talkies. She made her film debut starring in the 1929 talkie Song of Love. The film survives and has been screened at film festivals but not released on DVD. Song of Love features two songs performed by Baker written by her husband, "I'm Walking with the Moonbeams (Talking to the Stars)" and "Take Everything But You". She made two more film appearances, in Charing Cross Road (1935) and Atlantic City (1944; in which she performed "Nobody's Sweetheart").

Radio
In 1932, Baker became a regular on Jack Denny's radio program on CBS. She was a guest performer on The Eveready Hour, broadcasting's first major variety show, which featured Broadway's top headliners. Baker continued performing through the 1930s, but limited her performances to radio shows.

Personal life
Baker's first marriage was in 1913, to producer and promoter Lew Leslie. The couple divorced in 1918. In 1919, she married Maurice Abrahams,.  a successful Russian-American songwriter/composer, who wrote such songs as "Ragtime Cowboy Joe", "He'd Have to Get Under — Get Out and Get Under (to Fix Up His Automobile)", "I'm Walking with the Moonbeams (Talking to the Stars)", and "Take Everything But You". The couple had one child, Herbert Joseph Abrahams, later known as Herbert Baker, who became a screenwriter. After Abrahams' death in 1931, Baker restricted her performing to radio. On September 21, 1937, she remarried, to Elias Sugarman, editor of the theatrical trade magazine, Billboard. The couple divorced in 1941. She made one final television appearance in This Is Your Life in 1955, just two years before her death.

Death
 
Baker died on April 25, 1957 at Cedars of Lebanon Hospital in Los Angeles, California. She is buried in the Abrahams family mausoleum in Mount Judah Cemetery, Ridgewood, New York.

Filmography
 Song of Love (1929)
 Charing Cross Road (1935)
 Atlantic City (1944)

References

Links
New York Times: Mordaunt Hall review of Song of Love (November 14, 1929)

External links

Belle Baker at the Internet Archive

1893 births
1957 deaths
20th-century American actresses
American radio personalities
American film actresses
American stage actresses
American people of Russian-Jewish descent
Jewish women singers
Singers from New York City
Vaudeville performers
20th-century American singers
20th-century American women singers
Pathé Records artists
Victor Records artists
Brunswick Records artists